Blues Farm is an album by bassist Ron Carter recorded at Van Gelder Studio in New Jersey in 1973 and released on the CTI label.

Reception

Allmusic reviewer Nathan Bush states "Blues Farm'''s excursions are enjoyable, but somewhat reserved. Both the compositions and performances avoid strong emotions in favor of pleasing palettes of color and texture".

Track listingAll compositions by Ron Carter except as indicated''
 "Blues Farm" - 7:59 
 "A Small Ballad" - 5:38 
 "Django" (John Lewis) - 5:30 
 "A Hymn for Him" - 8:11 
 "Two-Beat Johnson" - 2:49 
 "R2, M1" - 6:08 
Recorded at Van Gelder Studio in Englewood Cliffs, New Jersey on January 10, 1973

Personnel
Ron Carter - bass, arranger, conductor
Hubert Laws - flute (tracks 1, 5 & 6)
Richard Tee  - electric piano, piano (tracks 1, 4 & 5)
Bob James - piano (tracks 2, 3 & 6)
Gene Bertoncini (track 5), Sam Brown (track 3) - guitar
Billy Cobham - drums 
Ralph MacDonald - percussion (tracks 1 & 4-6)

References

1973 albums
CTI Records albums
Ron Carter albums
Albums produced by Creed Taylor
Albums recorded at Van Gelder Studio